The Quick Draw McGraw Show is an animated television series produced by Hanna-Barbera. Every episode consists of a Quick Draw McGraw cartoon, an Augie Doggie and Doggie Daddy cartoon, and a Snooper and Blabber cartoon.

Series overview

Episodes
 QDMG = Quick Draw McGraw
 AD&DD = Augie Doggie and Doggie Daddy
 S&B = Snooper and Blabber
 No. overall = Overall episode number
 No. in season = Episode number by season

Season 1 (1959-60)

Season 2 (1960)

Season 3 (1961)

References

External links
 

Lists of American children's animated television series episodes